Margery Wilson (born Sara Barker Strayer; October 31, 1896 – January 21, 1986) was an American actress, writer, and silent movie director. She appeared in 51 films between 1914 and 1939.

Early life and education

Wilson was born in Gracey, Kentucky as Sara Barker Strayer, the daughter of Mr. and Mrs. Holmes B. Strayer. 

She received higher education in philosophy and literature while also pursuing social service work. Starting out, Wilson gave public performances in Cincinnati at clubs, schools, and churches. Later, she was able to tour from Ohio to Atlanta with the John Lawrence Players as the leading lady. 

By the age of 16, she founded her own theater company. She and her sister left for London on a world tour as musical entertainers. She changed her name when she was 16 because her relatives disliked having the family name associated with acting.

Film career

In 1914, Wilson traveled to Los Angeles to pursue a career in Hollywood. She was in a wide range of motion pictures but is best known for her portrayal of Brown Eyes, a character in the D.W. Griffith film Intolerance. She had three dozen roles, many of them leads.  

Wilson also was one of Hollywood's earliest women directors. Her career as a film writer, director, and producer was short, lasting from 1920 to 1922. Those three years did not include the time she toured with her films. She directed at least three movies: That Something (1920), The Offenders (1921), and Insinuation (1922). There are no surviving prints of any of her directing efforts. She finished her work as a film director by her late twenties.

Personal life and later life
Wilson had two children. Both of her children died before she did. She left the film production business to take care of her children after marrying Otto Meeks, the owner of a ranching empire (or "a prominent Western industrialist"). After his death, she married Grover Paulette Williamson. Her third husband, Vance Link Bushnell, died in 1947. Although she was no longer in film production, she stayed connected to the business by contributing to pamphlets about famous people. Owing to her Hollywood connections, she was able to write 50 of the pamphlets.

Professional achievements
She wrote guidance books that coached husbands on how to protect and treat their wives. In 1951, her book How to Make the Most of Wife was published. These books could also be considered inspirational nonfiction. Her autobiography, I Found My Way, was published in 1956. 

Wilson also authored several inspirational, self-help books for women, including Charm and The Woman You Want to Be. After her career as a filmmaker, she was a successful speech coach for actors and gave public lectures both on the radio and in person.

Partial filmography

The Lucky Transfer (1915, short) - The little girl
Double Trouble (1915) - Elizabeth Waldron
The Primal Lure (1916) - Lois Le Moyne
Eye of the Night (1916) - Jane
Intolerance (1916) - Brown Eyes
The Return of Draw Egan (1916) - Myrtle Buckton
A Corner in Colleens (1916) - Rose
The Honorable Algy (1916) - Patricia
The Sin Ye Do (1916) - Alice Ward
The Habit of Happiness (1916)
The Bride of Hate (1917) - Mercedes Mendoza
The Gunfighter (1917) - Norma Wright
The Last of the Ingrams (1917) - Mercy Reed
The Desert Man (1917) - Jennie
Wolf Lowry (1917) - Mary Davis
The Clodhopper (1917) - Mary Martin
The Mother Instinct (1917) - Marie Coutierre
Mountain Dew (1917) - Roxie Bradley
Wild Sumac (1917) - Wild Sumac
Without Honor (1918) - Jeanie McGregor
The Flames of Chance (1918) - Jeanette Gontreau
The Hard Rock Breed (1918) - Shiela Dolan
The Law of the Great Northwest (1918) - Marie Monest
The Hand at the Window (1918) - Laura Bowers
Old Love for New (1918) - Gwendolyn Alcot
Marked Cards (1918) - Ellen Shannon
Venus in the East (1919) - Martha
Crooked Straight (1919) - Vera Owen
Desert Gold (1919) - Mercedes Castenada
The Blooming Angel (1920) - Carlotta
That Something (1920, co-director) - Dorah Holmes
The House of Whispers (1920) - Clara Bradford
Why Not Marry? (1922)
Insinuation (1922, director) - Mary Wright
The Offenders (1922, co-director)

References

External links

Margery Wilson at the Women Film Pioneers Project
Literature on Margery Wilson
portraits of Margery Wilson photo#1, photo#2, photo#3

1896 births
1986 deaths
American film actresses
American silent film actresses
American women film directors
People from Christian County, Kentucky
20th-century American actresses
Women film pioneers
Film directors from Kentucky